Tyrone McCarthy (born 21 April 1988) is an Ireland international former rugby league footballer who played as a  or  for the Leigh Centurions in the Betfred Super League.

He previously played for the Warrington Wolves in the Super League, and on loan from Warrington at Leigh and the Swinton Lions in the Championship, and the Wakefield Trinity Wildcats in the Super League. McCarthy played for the Northern Pride in the Queensland Cup, before returning to the top flight in Europe with Hull Kingston Rovers. He played for the St. George Illawarra Dragons in the NRL, spending time with their feeder club Illawarra in the Intrust Super Premiership NSW. He then spent four seasons at the Salford Red Devils in the European Super League.

Background
McCarthy was born in Warrington, Cheshire, England, with his family hailing from Clonality, County Cork, Ireland.

Club career

Warrington Wolves
McCarthy made his début in the Super League for Warrington on 14 August 2009 against Wigan. He played as a substitute in the 2009 Challenge Cup Final in only his third first-team appearance.

McCarthy spent time on loan in the Championship with Leigh in 2010 and at fellow Super League club the Wakefield Trinity Wildcats in 2011, making 7 appearances before returning to his parent club.

He scored a try in the 2012 Challenge Cup Final victory over Leeds at Wembley Stadium.

Northern Pride
In 2014 he signed for the Queensland Cup side Northern Pride, playing a key role as the Pride won the 2014 Intrust Super Cup, and the inaugural NRL State Championship.

Hull KR
McCarthy returned to the Super League in 2015, signing with the Hull Kingston Rovers. Following a season-ending injury to captain Terry Campese, McCarthy was named as the acting captain for the remainder of the year and led the team out at Wembley Stadium for the 2015 Challenge Cup Final, which Hull Kingston Rovers lost 50–0 to Leeds.

St. George Illawarra
On 7 September 2015 it was announced that Tyrone McCarthy signed for the St. George Illawarra Dragons on a two-year deal beginning in 2016.

Salford Red Devils
He played in the 2019 Super League Grand Final defeat by St Helens at Old Trafford.

He played in the 2020 Challenge Cup Final defeat for Salford against Leeds at Wembley Stadium.

Leigh Centurions
On 6 February 2021, it was reported that he had signed for Leigh in the Super League.

International career
McCarthy is an Ireland international, having made his début in a victory over Serbia in 2009. He was named Ireland vice-captain in the build-up to the 2013 Rugby League World Cup.

References

External links

Salford profile
(archived by web.archive.org) Salford Red Devils profile
(archived by web.archive.org) St. George Illawarra Dragons profile
(archived by web.archive.org) Profile at warringtonwolves.com
SL profile
(archived by web.archive.org) Statistics at rlwc2017.com

1988 births
Living people
English people of Irish descent
English rugby league players
Hull Kingston Rovers players
Illawarra Cutters players
Ireland national rugby league team players
Leigh Leopards players
Northern Pride RLFC players
Rugby league locks
Rugby league players from Warrington
Rugby league second-rows
St. George Illawarra Dragons players
Wakefield Trinity players
Warrington Wolves players